Hamdy Ahmed Mohamed Khalifa (9 November 1933, Sohag, Egypt – 8 January 2016) was an Egyptian actor. He is known for his role as Mahjoub Abdel Dayem in the film Cairo 30 (1966). Ahmed was a parliamentary representative for the district of Bulaq at the time of the forcible relocation of the population of that quarter to public housing in the az-Zawiya al-Hamra district in the periphery of Cairo. He was a member of the Labour Party of Egypt, but left it in 1984. Ahmed was also a columnist for the newspaper Elosboa (الأسبوع).

Filmography

References

External links

Hamdy Ahmed at ElCinema

1933 births
2016 deaths
Egyptian male film actors
Members of the House of Representatives (Egypt)
Egyptian journalists
People from Sohag Governorate